The Italians They Are Crazy (Italian: Gli italiani sono matti) is a 1958 Italian-German comedy film directed by Duilio Coletti and Luis María Delgado and starring Victor McLaglen, Folco Lulli and Gabriella Pallotta.

Plot
Some Italian prisoners in a German concentration camp bet with its commandant that they could build a church in two hours.

Cast

References

Bibliography
 Parish, James Robert. Film Actors Guide. Scarecrow Press, 1977.

External links
 

1958 films
1958 comedy films
1950s Italian-language films
German comedy films
Italian comedy films
Films directed by Duilio Coletti
Films directed by Luis María Delgado
Films with screenplays by Luciano Vincenzoni
1950s Italian films
1950s German films